2013 Kazan Summer Cup – Doubles may refer to either of the following events at the 2013 Kazan Summer Cup:

 2013 Kazan Summer Cup – Men's Doubles
 2013 Kazan Summer Cup – Women's Doubles